During World War II, Operation Keystone was a Special Air Service patrol consisting of a number of jeep-mounted and airborne teams that operated south of IJsselmeer in the central Netherlands in early April, 1945. 

By the middle of the month, the team had joined up with the Archway team.

Operation Plunder
Special Air Service
World War II British Commando raids